Amara  Khaira Chowk is a census town in Varanasi tehsil of Varanasi district in the Indian state of Uttar Pradesh. The census town and village falls under the Amra khaira chowk gram panchayat. Amara Khaira Chowk  Census town and village is about 12 kilometers South-West of Varanasi railway station, 317 kilometers  South-East of Lucknow and 9 kilometers South-West of Banaras Hindu University main gate.
Legislative assembly= Rohaniya

Demography
Amara  Khaira Chak has 1,044 families with a total population of 6,577. Sex ratio of the census town & village is 916 and child sex ratio is 965. Uttar Pradesh state average for both ratios is 912 and  902 respectively.
The most powerful family in this Village is of Thakurs and pandits, although the population of Rajbhar/Patel/Maurya and few other castes is much higher than thakur.
During the reign of Britishers Raja Ajit Kumar Singh was the Zamindar of Amra Khaira Chak, he was the true devotee of Lord Shiva and used to have food only after offering milk/jal to the Shivling at Kandwa Pokhra. Britishers were so scared of him that they made several attempts of killing him so that another Babu Veer Kunwar Singh is not born, and after two-three unsuccessful they finally were able to kill Raja Ajit Kumar Singh on 29 Feb'1932.

Transportation
Amara  Khaira Chak is connected by air (Lal Bahadur Shastri Airport), by train  (Varanasi railway station) and by road.  Nearest operational airports is Lal Bahadur Shastri Airport and nearest  operational railway station is Varanasi railway station (35 and 12 kilometers respectively from Amara Khaira  Chak).

See also
 Varanasi (Lok Sabha constituency)

References

Census towns in Varanasi district
Cities and towns in Varanasi district